Oscar Stark (born 1 November 1988) is a Swedish professional golfer.

Stark attended Oklahoma Christian University where he won the 2011 NAIA Men's Golf Championship. He played golf in North America for another two years, before qualifying for the Challenge Tour at the 2013 European Q-School, falling two strokes short of direct qualification to the European Tour.

On the 2016 Challenge Tour, he secured top-five finishes at the Swiss Challenge and the Hainan Open, and tied for second at the Cordon Golf Open to finish in 31st spot on the Road to Oman. He secured his maiden Challenge Tour victory at the 2017 Made in Denmark Challenge.

Professional wins (1)

Challenge Tour wins (1)

References

External links

Swedish male golfers
Oklahoma Christian Eagles golfers
European Tour golfers
Sportspeople from Gothenburg
1988 births
Living people